Here's to New Dreams is the debut album by the American actress and singer Raven-Symoné. It was released on June 22, 1993 by MCA Records.

Background 
Raven signed to MCA Records at the age of 5, (making her the youngest artist ever signed to a label) but didn't release the album until she was 7 years old. The album sold 73,000 copies to date. According to the thank you's within the liner notes, she was signed to MCA Records by Wendy Credle and received vocal training lessons from collaborator Missy Elliott, who was then credited as Melissa Elliott.

Promotion 
The song "That's What Little Girls Are Made Of" was the first single written/produced by Melissa "Missy" Elliott. "Raven Is the Flavor" was also released as a single.

Track listing

Chart

Singles

"Raven Is the Flavor" 
"Raven Is the Flavor" is the second single from the album.

Track listing 
CD Single
 "Onele Is the Flavor" (Main Mix)
 "Raven Is the Flavor" (Album Version)

Vinyl, 12", Promo
 "Raven Is the Flavor" (Main Mix)
 "Raven Is the Flavor" (Album Version)
 "Raven Is the Flavor" (Main Mix)
 "Raven Is the Flavor" (Album Version)

References

1993 debut albums
Albums produced by Missy Elliott
MCA Records albums
Raven-Symoné albums